In Person at the Whisky a Go Go is a live album by Otis Redding, recorded at the Whisky a Go Go on Sunset Strip in Los Angeles, California in April 1966. It was released posthumously in 1968. The recording was made before Otis Redding attained crossover fame at the Monterey Pop Festival.

The original issue of the album presented a selection of songs from the three shows. Another selection was released in 1993 under the title Good to Me: Live at the Whisky a Go Go, Vol. 2. The complete live performances were released on October 21, 2016.

Track listing

Personnel
 Otis Redding – vocals
 Katie Webster - keyboards, piano
 James Young – guitar
 Ralph Stewart – bass guitar
 Elbert Woodson – drums
 Sammy Coleman, John Farris – trumpet
 Clarence Johnson – trombone
 Robert Holloway, Donald Henry, Robert Pittman – tenor saxophone

Charts

Album

Singles

References

Otis Redding albums
Live albums published posthumously
1968 live albums
Albums produced by Nesuhi Ertegun
Atco Records live albums
Albums recorded at the Whisky a Go Go